The 2021 Brest Challenger was a professional tennis tournament played on hard courts. It was the sixth edition of the tournament which was part of the 2021 ATP Challenger Tour. It took place in Brest, France between 25 and 31 October 2021.

Singles main-draw entrants

Seeds

 1 Rankings are as of 18 October 2021.

Other entrants
The following players received wildcards into the singles main draw:
  Manuel Guinard
  Arthur Rinderknech
  Luca Van Assche

The following player received entry into the singles main draw as a special exempt:
  Carlos Taberner

The following player received entry into the singles main draw as an alternate:
  Maxime Janvier

The following players received entry from the qualifying draw:
  Kenny de Schepper
  Aleksandr Nedovyesov
  Zsombor Piros
  Alexey Vatutin

The following player received entry as a lucky loser:
  Valentin Royer

Champions

Singles

  Brandon Nakashima def.  João Sousa 6–3, 6–3.

Doubles

  Sadio Doumbia /  Fabien Reboul def.  Salvatore Caruso /  Federico Gaio 4–6, 6–3, [10–3].

References

2021 ATP Challenger Tour
2021 in French tennis
October 2021 sports events in France
Brest Challenger